Daxi District, formerly known as Daxi Township, is a district in eastern Taoyuan City, Taiwan. In March 2012, it was named one of the Top 10 Small Tourist Towns by the Tourism Bureau of Taiwan.

History
The Daxi area was occupied for several thousand years by the Atayal people. The Atayal called the local river (modern-day Dahan Creek) Takoham in their native Austronesian language. This gave rise to similar names such as Toa-kho-ham (also ) in Hokkien and Taikokan in Japanese via transliteration.

Eighteenth-century Han settlement in the Taipei Basin led many Atayal families to relocate upriver, though some Atayal stayed and mingled with the newcomers. The settlement later became an important trading post in the 19th century.

In 1803, open fighting broke out between two rival factions of Han settlers in Taipei, and many refugees fled south for safety. Among the refugees was the Lin Ben Yuan Family, one of the wealthiest clans in Taiwan at the time. The clan settled in Takoham, invested its fortunes in the settlement and brought prosperity to the whole region. Due to its strategic location and the investments made by the Lin clan, Takoham became the center of trading and transportation between Taipei and the south. Goods would arrive here to be transported to Taipei via Dahan river, and many traders opened their shops in the area; some of the shops still exist today in the old town section.

When the North-South Railway that bypasses the Takoham settlement was completed in 1909, the importance of river trade declined. Takoham lost its significance in North-South transportation, and is no longer a significant trading port. On the other hand, it became famous for the production of wooden furniture. In 1920, the Japanese government renamed this area 大溪 ("big creek"), pronounced Daikei in Japanese and Dàxī in Mandarin, which was administered under Shinchiku Prefecture.

 is a popular ingredient in Taiwanese cuisine. Daxi is also home to the mausoleums of two Kuomintang leaders: the late president Chiang Kai-shek in nearby Cihu and his son Chiang Ching-kuo in Touliao.

Administrative divisions
Xinghe, Furen, Tianxin, Yixin, Yide, Yuemei, Yongfu, Kangan, Yihe, Meihua, Fuan, Fuxing, Xinfeng, Zhongxin, Ruixing, Renshan, Qiaoai, Renyi, Renhe, Renai, Renwu, Renwen, Nanxing, Yuanlin, Guangming, Ruiyuan and Sanyuan Village.

Economy
The headquarters of Kimlan Foods is located in Daxi.

Tourist attractions
 A-mu Ping
 Cihu Mausoleum
 Cihur
 Daxi Bridge
 Daxi Health Herb Garden
 Daxi Old Street
 Daxi Wood Art Ecomuseum
 Daxi Wude Hall
 Furen Temple
 Hoping Old Street
 Jien's Archaic Mansion
 Kuanyin Temple at Lotus Seat Mountain
 Lee Teng-fan's Ancient Residence
 Mei-hwa Spinning Top Museum
 Presbyterian Church of Daxi
 Puzi Temple
 Saint Franciscan Catholic Church
 Taoliao Lake
 Touliao Mausoleum
 Ximen Reservoir
 Zaiming Temple
 Zhongshan Road
 Zhongzheng Park

Local celebration Festival
 DAXI DAXI
 Daxi Dried Tofu Festival

Transportation

Bus

Daxi Bus Station of Taoyuan Bus have most of routes to Daxi, and 5096 route from Taoyuan Station and 5098 route from Zhongli Station send every 10 to 20 minutes.
Taiwan Tourist Shuttle Routes have Daxi Express to Daxi and Xiaowulai Route also passes through Daxi.
Ropo Bus have 710 Express from Yongning Station of Taipei Metro to Daxi.

Road
Daxi is served by National Highway No. 3 and Provincial Highway No. 66.

Notable natives
 Fong Fei-fei, former singer and actress

See also
 Taoyuan City

References

Bibliography

External links

Dasi Old Streets
Daxi Town International Information System 

Districts of Taoyuan City
Taiwan placenames originating from Formosan languages